Jeffrey Stuart Skoll, OC (born January 16, 1965) is a Canadian engineer, billionaire internet entrepreneur and film producer. He was the first president of eBay, eventually using the wealth this gave him to become a philanthropist, particularly through the Skoll Foundation, and his media company Participant Media. He founded an investment firm, Capricorn Investment Group, soon after and currently serves as its chairman. Born in Montreal, Quebec, he graduated from University of Toronto in 1987 and left Canada to attend Stanford University's business school in 1993.

Shortly after graduating from business school, he began his career at eBay where he wrote the business plan that the company followed from its emergence as a start-up to a larger company. While at the company, he began the eBay Foundation which was allocated pre-IPO stock now worth $32 million.  Once eBay's second largest stockholder, behind Omidyar, he subsequently cashed out a portion of his company holdings, yielding him around $2 billion. With an estimated net worth of US$4 billion (as of December 2016), Skoll was ranked by Forbes as the 7th wealthiest Canadian and 134th in the United States.

Through his film production company, Participant–of which he is founder, owner, and chairman–he has produced numerous critically acclaimed films. His first films Syriana (2005), Good Night, and Good Luck (2005), and North Country (2005), along with the documentary Murderball (2005), accounted for 11 Oscar nominations in 2006. His subsequent films have included An Inconvenient Truth (2006), Fast Food Nation (2006), The World According to Sesame Street (2006),  Waiting for "Superman" (2010), Lincoln (2012), and his latest, Spotlight (2015) won the Academy Award for Best Picture in 2016.

Early life 
Jeff Skoll was born to a Jewish family in Montreal, Quebec, Canada. His mother was a teacher and his father was a chemical company owner who sold industrial chemicals. The family settled in Toronto in the late seventies. When Skoll was fourteen, his father was diagnosed with cancer which prompted him to discuss with his son how much he regretted not having had the time to do everything he had planned in life. His first job was pumping gas at a York Mills gas station.

He graduated with a BASc with honours in 1987 from the University of Toronto's electrical engineering program. While an undergraduate student, he co-edited the engineering students' satirical newspaper The Toike Oike. He paid his way through college by pumping gas in North York, Ontario. After graduating he backpacked around the world for several months before returning and founding two businesses in Toronto: Skoll Engineering, an information technology consulting firm and Micros on the Move Ltd., a computer rental firm. He left Canada in 1993 to earn a Master of Business Administration degree at Stanford Business School, graduating in 1995. After Stanford he went to work at Knight-Ridder where he was working on internet projects for the publishing company.

Skoll's eBay era 

In 1996 Skoll met eBay's founder Pierre Omidyar, who hired him as the company's first president and first full-time employee. While eBay was already profitable at the time Skoll joined, he wrote the business plan that eBay followed in subsequent years. He remained President until the arrival of Meg Whitman in January 1998 when he became Vice President, Strategic Planning and Analysis until back problems necessitated his departure from full-time employment at the company. In 1998, he championed the creation of the eBay Foundation, which was allocated pre-IPO stock now worth $32 million.  Once eBay's second largest stockholder, behind Omidyar, he subsequently cashed out a portion of his company holdings, yielding him around $2 billion.

Participant 

In 2004, Skoll founded the company Participant to create films that increase public awareness of critical social issues and give audiences opportunities to get involved through education and social action campaigns. In 2005, Skoll's first Participant productions were released, with Syriana; Good Night, and Good Luck; North Country; and Murderball, together garnering 11 Oscar nominations. A year later, Skoll financed and played a key role in the creation of the environmental documentary, An Inconvenient Truth, which grew out of a slideshow developed by former U.S. Vice President Al Gore on the climate crisis. The film won the 2006 Academy Award for Best Feature Documentary. “ I would never have predicted that a film like An Inconvenient Truth would impact so many people,” Skoll told Philanthropy Roundtable.

The Financial Times reported in 2009 that Participant allows Skoll to "pursue social and political causes through a mass medium. From modest beginnings, the company (which Skoll chairs, supported by a team of executives) is now a serious player." Fortune wrote the next year that Skoll's films are not typical Hollywood fare, "they tackle weighty subjects such as eco-Armageddon, petro-terrorism, education reform, and women’s rights. In short they tend to reflect Skoll’s progressive, and ultimately optimistic, worldview that shining a light on the world’s problems will inspire people to band together to bring about change on a large scale. (Indeed, the name 'Participant' evokes a call to action.)"

Skoll has served as Executive Producer or Producer on nearly 100 Participant films, including Spotlight, Roma, and American Factory, and as of 2019 Participant has won 18 Oscars and received 73 Academy Award nominations. In 2020, the company received another Academy Award nomination and win for best documentary feature for American Factory.

According to The Hollywood Reporter, in 2014 Skoll funded the creation of the Skoll Center for Social Impact Entertainment at the UCLA School of Theater, Film and Television, saying at the time: "I founded Participant Media in the belief that a story well told has the power to ignite positive social change. This new center at UCLA TFT is an extension of that vision, with the goal of empowering a new generation and elevating storytelling as a tool to create impact and empower people to connect to the social issues that can have a profound impact on our world." In March, 2019, Participant and the Skoll Center for Social Impact Entertainment released a report, "The State of Social Impact Entertainment," that said: "social impact entertainment — narrative and documentary film, television, theater, and emerging forms that engage audiences in solving real-world challenges — is not a fad but the future of the entertainment industry."

In 2019, on behalf of Participant, Skoll and Participant CEO David Linde accepted the newly created TIFF Impact Award from the Toronto International Film Festival; in 2020 the award was renamed the Jeff Skoll Award in Impact Media and was awarded to Mira Nair.

Philanthropy 
Skoll is a recipient of the Carnegie Medal of Philanthropy, and a Giving Pledge signatory. He has given the eponymous Skoll Foundation approximately $1 billion of eBay stock since its formation in 1999. The Foundation supports "social entrepreneurship".

As of 2020, Skoll has been working for over ten years to help prevent pandemics and other global threats. In 2009, Skoll donated $100 million to create the Skoll Global Threats Fund to confront threats including climate change, water security, pandemics, nuclear proliferation, and Middle East conflict. The Fund created and spun off a stand-alone non-profit entity, Ending Pandemics, that focuses on pandemic detection and response. In 2011, Skoll's film company Participant co-produced the film Contagion to raise awareness about the dangers posed by pandemics. Skoll wanted the film be scientifically sound and encourage funding of medical experts; In 2020, following the COVID-19 pandemic media coverage noted it was "shocking in its accuracy".

In January 2020, Skoll donated $20 million, and an additional $100 million in April, to the Skoll Foundation to combat the COVID-19 pandemic. The funds were used to assist with testing, contact tracing, and provide respiratory devices and other medical equipment to countries that couldn't afford it.

Skoll is active in "collaborative philanthropy" and has joined with other philanthropists and foundations to pool resources that then flow to non-profits focused on addressing specific issues at scale. In 2017, Skoll, joined with others to create Co-Impact, a philanthropic funding collaborative seeded with $500 million, whose "specific aim is to fund organizations that are addressing health, education and economic opportunity in low-to-middle income countries".

Similarly in 2018, Skoll, Chris Anderson, Virgin Unite, among others launched The Audacious Project, a philanthropic funding collaborative with an initial investment of $250 million for "audacious ideas" that deliver "impact at scale". Some of the first recipients of funding from The Audacious Project included the Environmental Defense Fund, Sight Savers, and The Bail Project.

Skoll has funded the creation of academic centers at two universities. In 2003, Skoll funded the creation of the Skoll Center for Social Entrepreneurship at Oxford University's Said Business School. The center is a research center, hub for innovators, and host of the annual Skoll World Forum on Social Entrepreneurship. Called the “Davos for the nonprofit set” by Forbes, Skoll World Forum participants have included leading thinkers from South African Archbishop Desmond Tutu to former U.S. Vice President Al Gore. In 2019, Skoll also funded the creation of the Skoll Center for Social Impact Entertainment at the UCLA School of Theater, Film and Television. The center is dedicated to promoting social change through entertainment and the arts.

In 2005, Skoll financed The Gandhi Project in partnership with Relief International which created a dubbed version in Arabic of the film Gandhi. They used Palestinian voice actors and artists to make the film particularly relevant to Palestinians. With Skoll's support, it was screened throughout Palestine to promote non-violence, self-reliance, economic development, and empowerment.

In 2000, Skoll gave C$7.5 million to the University of Toronto to endow three chairs and establish the Jeffrey Skoll BASc/MBA Program, a joint program of the Faculty of Applied Science and Engineering and the Rotman School of Management.

Impact investing
Skoll was one of the earliest proponents of socially responsible investing, called "impact investing", through which he invests in for-profit companies whose mission is to deliver both social impact and financial returns. In 2001, Skoll created Capricorn Investment Group "on the premise of socially responsible investing" and the firm now oversees more than $5 billion in client assets and another $3.5 billion in partnership with other organizations. According to Forbes, a "significant portion" of Capricorn's assets "has been put to work backing mostly private companies that are in some way aiming to help the environment and combat climate change". Capricorn's early investments included electric carmaker Tesla, Inc., battery technology developer QuantumScape, and air taxi developer Joby Aviation. Other investments include private equity fund Encourage Solar Finance to promote rooftop solar installations in India.

In 2016, Skoll, along with Bono and investment firm TPG, co-founded The Rise Fund, a $2 billion social-impact fund with "a series of strict metrics by which to measure social impact". Rise's investments fall across seven sectors, including agriculture, education, and healthcare, and since 2017, "Rise has invested in more than 25 growth-stage companies that are making a measurable positive social and/or environmental impact".

Other Activities 
As of November 2022, Skoll became a minority owner of Monumental Sports & Entertainment, which owns the NHL's 2018 Champion Washington Capitals, NBA's Washington Wizards, NBA G League's Capital City Go-Go, WNBA's 2019 Champion Washington Mystics, NBA 2K League’s 2020 & 2021 Champion Wizard District Gaming. Monumental Sports additionally owns Capital One Arena in Washington, D.C., NBC Sports Washington and manages the MedStar Capitals Iceplex and George Mason University's EagleBank Arena.

Personal life 
In 2014, Skoll married television executive Stephanie Swedlove. In January 2019, it was announced Skoll had filed for divorce from Swedlove.

Honors and Awards 
 Bloomberg Business Week's list of most innovative philanthropists (2002–present)
 National Leadership Award for Commonwealth Club Silicon Valley (2004)
 Outstanding Philanthropist Award from the International Association of Fundraising Professionals (2003)
 Outstanding Philanthropist Award from the Silicon Valley chapter of the Association of Fundraising Professionals (2002)
 Honorary Doctor of Laws degree from the University of Toronto (2003)
 Time Magazine's 100 People of the Year (2006)
 Wired Magazine's Rave Award (2006)
 He was made an Officer of the Order of Canada "for his generous commitment to social causes and for his innovative practice of philanthropy." (2011)
 Carnegie Medal of Philanthropy (2017)

Filmography

Film
{| class="wikitable"
|-
! style="background:#B0C4DE;" | Year
! style="background:#B0C4DE;" | Title
! style="background:#B0C4DE;" | Notes
|-
| 2004 || House of D || executive producer
|-
|rowspan="4"| 2005 || Good Night, and Good Luck || executive producer
|-
| North Country || executive producer
|-
| Syriana || executive producer
|-
| American Gun || executive producer
|-
|rowspan="3"| 2006 || The World According to Sesame Street || executive producer
|-
| An Inconvenient Truth || executive producer
|-
| Fast Food Nation || executive producer
|-
|rowspan="8"| 2007 || Chicago 10 || executive producer
|-
| Angels in the Dust || executive producer
|-
| Man from Plains || executive producer
|-
| Darfur Now || executive producer
|-
| The Kite Runner || executive producer
|-
| Charlie Wilson's War || executive producer
|-
| The Visitor || executive producer
|-
| Man from Plains || executive producer
|-
|rowspan="3"| 2008 || Standard Operating Procedure || executive producer
|-
| Pressure Cooker || executive producer
|-
| Food, Inc. || executive producer
|-
|rowspan="2"| 2009 || The Soloist || executive producer
|-
| The Informant! || executive producer
|-
|rowspan="7"| 2010 || The Crazies || executive producer
|-
| Furry Vengeance || executive producer
|-
| Waiting for "Superman" || executive producer
|-
| Fair Game || executive producer
|-
| Countdown to Zero || executive producer
|-
| Cane Toads: The Conquest || executive producer
|-
| Casino Jack and the United States of Money || executive producer
|-
|rowspan="5"| 2011 || The Beaver || executive producer
|-
| The Help || executive producer
|-
| Contagion || executive producer
|-
| Last Call at the Oasis || executive producer
|-
| The Best Exotic Marigold Hotel || executive producer
|-
|rowspan="5"| 2012 || A Place at the Table || executive producer
|-
| State 194 || executive producer
|-
| Lincoln || executive producer
|-
| Promised Land || executive producer
|-
| No || executive producer
|-
|rowspan="5"| 2013 || Snitch || executive producer
|-
| Made in America || executive producer
|-
| The Fifth Estate || executive producer
|-
| The Square || executive producer
|-
| The Unknown Known || executive producer
|-
|rowspan="10"| 2014 || Ceaser Chavez || executive producer
|-
| The Great Invisible || executive producer
|-
| Misconception || executive producer
|-
| The Prophet || executive producer
|-
| The Ardor || executive producer
|-
| The Hundred-Foot Journey || executive producer
|-
| Out of the Dark || executive producer
|-
| Merchants of Doubt || executive producer
|-
| Citizenfour || executive producer
|-
| A Most Violent Year || executive producer
|-
|rowspan="7"| 2015 || 3 1/2 Minutes, 10 Bullets || executive producer
|-
| The Second Best Exotic Marigold Hotel || executive producer
|-
| He Named Me Malala || executive producer
|-
| Bridge of Spies || executive producer
|-
| Beasts of No Nation || executive producer
|-
| Our Brand Is Crisis || executive producer
|-
| Spotlight || executive producer
|-
|rowspan="10"| 2016 || Zero Days || executive producer
|-
| The Music of Strangers || executive producer
|-
| Death by a Thousand Cuts || executive producer
|-
| Neruda || producer
|-
| The Light Between Oceans || executive producer
|-
| Denial || executive producer
|-
| Deepwater Horizon || executive producer
|-
| Middle School: The Worst Years of My Life || executive producer
|-
| A Monster Calls || executive producer
|-
| Midsommer in Newtown || executive producer
|-
|rowspan="7"| 2017 || An Inconvenient Sequel: Truth to Power || producer
|-
| Melting Ice || executive producer
|-
| A Fantastic Woman || executive producer
|-
| Shot Caller || executive producer
|-
| Human Flow || executive producer
|-
| Far from the Tree || executive producer
|-
| Wonder || executive producer
|-
| rowspan="8" | 2018 || The Price of Free || executive producer 
|-
| 7 Days in Entebbe || executive producer
|-
| Foster || executive producer
|-
| This is Climate Change || executive producer
|-
| Roma || executive producer
|-
| Aquarela || executive producer
|-
| Green Book || executive producer
|-
| On the Basis of Sex || executive producer
|-
| rowspan="8"| 2019 || The Boy Who Harnessed the Wind || executive producer
|-
| American Factory || executive producer
|-
| Captive State || executive producer
|-
| Watson || executive producer
|-
| Slay the Dragon || executive producer
|-
| Just Mercy || executive producer
|-
| Sing Me a Song || executive producer
|-
| Dark Waters || executive producer
|-
| rowspan="4"| 2020 || John Lewis: Good Trouble || executive producer
|-
| Final Account || executive producer
|-
| American Utopia || executive producer
|-
| Totally Under Control || executive producer
|-
| rowspan="5"| 2021 || My Name is Pauli Murray || executive producer
|-
| Judas and the Black Messiah || executive producer
|-
| Unseen Skies || executive producer
|-
| White Coat Rebels || executive producer
|-
| Stillwater || executive producer
|-
| 2022 || White Bird: A Wonder Story || executive producer
|-
| TBA || ¡Viva Maestro! || executive producer
|}

TV series

 See also 
 List of billionaires
 List of Canadians
 List of University of Toronto people
 List of Stanford University people

 References 

 External links 
 
 Skoll Foundation
 Skoll Centre, Oxford University
 Participant Productions
 
 My journey into movies that matter, talk at TED March 2007
 Wood, Gaby, The Observer – Hollywood's new politics, January 8, 2006
Forbes – "The World's Richest People" February 13, 2006
 Forbes.com: Forbes World's Richest People 2004
 Jeff Skoll and Philanthropy, transformationalleadershiphq.com''

1965 births
Living people
American billionaires
Anglophone Quebec people
Businesspeople from Los Angeles
Businesspeople from Montreal
Businesspeople in information technology
Businesspeople in online retailing
Canadian billionaires
Canadian computer businesspeople
Canadian computer scientists
Canadian engineers
Canadian expatriates in the United States
Film producers from Quebec
EBay employees
Giving Pledgers
21st-century philanthropists
Jewish Canadian philanthropists
Officers of the Order of Canada
Businesspeople from San Jose, California
Stanford Graduate School of Business alumni
University of Toronto alumni
21st-century Canadian businesspeople
20th-century Canadian businesspeople
People from Woodside, California
American independent film production company founders
Jewish Canadian filmmakers